The Mammoth Book of Erotica is an Erotic literature anthology edited by Maxim Jakubowski that was originally published in 1994, with a revised edition published in 2000. It was published by Robinson Publishing in the United Kingdom (2000 reprint by Robinson imprint of Constable & Robinson), and by Carroll & Graf (Avalon Publishing Group imprint) in the United States.

Contents 

 Maxim Jakubowski: Introduction
 Alice Joanou: "A"
 Thomas S. Roche: The Isle of the Dead
 Dion Farquhar: Pure Porn
 Robert Silverberg: Two At Once
 Leonard Cohen: A Long Letter From F.
 Catherine Sellars: Death and Seduction
 Vicki Hendricks: Tender Fruit
 Anne Rice: Beauty's Punishment
 Stewart Home: Ooh Baby, You Turn Me On
 Maxim Jakubowski: The K.C. Suite
 Michael Hemmingson: Hollow Hills
 Marco Vassi: A Carcass of Dreams
 Lisa Palac: Needless to Say
 Cris Mazza: Between Signs
 Michael Perkins: Evil Companions
 Adam-Troy Castro: The Girl in Booth Nine
 Lucy Taylor: The Safety of Unknown Cities
 Mark Pritchard: Lessons in Submission
 Paul Mayersberg: Violent Silence
 Lucienne Zager: The Paris Craftsman
 Denise Danks: Frame Grabber
 David Guy: Married Love
 Samuel R. Delany: Equinox
 Alina Reyes: The Butcher
 Marilyn Jaye Lewis: Chapters in a Past Life
 Lucy Taylor: Baubo's Kiss
 Kathy Acker: Desire Begins
 Clive Barker: The Age of Desire
 Alice Joanou: L'enfer
 Sean O Caoimh: Small Death in Venice

References

1994 anthologies
Fiction anthologies
Erotic fiction